The 2013 Clásica de Almería was the 28th edition of the Clásica de Almería cycle race and was held on 24 February 2013. The race started in Roquetas de Mar and finished in Almería. The race was won by Mark Renshaw.

General classification

References

2013
2013 in road cycling
2013 in Spanish sport